Grammodes is a genus of moths in the family Erebidae first described by Achille Guenée in 1852.

Description
Palpi upturned, reaching just above vertex of head and minute third joint. Antennae almost simple in male. Thorax and abdomen smoothly scaled and somewhat slender. Tibia clothed with rather long hair. Min tibia spiny. Forewings short and broad with somewhat acute apex. Larva with three pairs of abdominal prolegs.

Species
 Grammodes afrocculta Berio, 1956
 Grammodes arenosa Swinhoe, 1902
 Grammodes bifasciata Petagna, 1738 (syn: Grammodes chalciptera (Borkhausen, 1792), Grammodes linearis (Hübner, 1790), Grammodes paralellaris (Hübner, 1803))
 Grammodes boisdeffrii Oberthür, 1867
 Grammodes buchanani Rothschild, 1921
 Grammodes congenita Walker, 1858
 Grammodes congesta Berio, 1956
 Grammodes cooma Swinhoe, 1900
 Grammodes diagarmma Lower, 1903
 Grammodes euclidioides Guenée, 1852 (syn: Grammodes dubitans (Walker, 1858), Grammodes postfumida (Wiltshire, 1970))
 Grammodes geometrica (Fabricius, 1775)
 Grammodes justa Walker, 1858
 Grammodes latifera Walker, 1870
 Grammodes marwitzi Gaede, 1914
 Grammodes microgonia (Hampson, 1910)
 Grammodes monodonta Berio, 1956 (syn: Grammodes somaliensis Berio, 1956)
 Grammodes netta Holland, 1897
 Grammodes occulta Berio, 1956 (syn: Grammodes samosira Kobes, 1985)
 Grammodes ocellata Tepper, 1890
 Grammodes oculata Snellen, 1880
 Grammodes oculicola Walker, 1858
 Grammodes paerambar Brandt, 1939
 Grammodes pulcherrima Lucas, 1892
 Grammodes quaesita Swinhoe, 1901
 Grammodes stolida (Fabricius, 1775) – geometrician

References

 
 

Ophiusini
Moth genera